Abies squamata is a species of conifer in the family Pinaceae.
This fir is common in the Southeast of the Tibetan Plateau (China) in an altitude from 3200 m to tree-line in 4400 m. It is dominant on North-facing slopes and often grows with Balfour's spruce, Picea balfouriana. Government sector logging that was rampant until the logging ban in 1998 reduced fir stands significantly. Reforestation after the ban was dominated by spruce, since Abies squamata is susceptible to stem rot and thus shunned by the state forest bureaus (Ryavec & Winkler 2009). Undergrowth is most commonly dominated by members of the genus Rhododendron. Local Tibetans know this fir as "bollo", but that term is a general term for firs and spruces.

References 

 Ryavec, Karl & Winkler, Daniel 2009. Logging Impacts to Forests in Tibetan Areas of Southwest China. A Case Study from Ganze Prefecture Based on 1998 Landsat TM Imagery. In: Himalaya - Journal of the Association for Nepal & Himalayan Studies 2006, vol. 26.1: 38–45.  link: http://mushroaming.com/sites/default/files/Ryavec%20Winkler%203-2009.pdf

squamata
Trees of China
Flora of Sichuan
Flora of Tibet
Vulnerable flora of Asia
Taxonomy articles created by Polbot